WHMC-FM (90.1 FM) is a radio station  broadcasting a public radio format. Licensed to Conway, South Carolina, United States, the station serves Myrtle Beach and the Grand Strand.  The station is currently owned by South Carolina Educational TV Commission.  The station is a member of NPR and an affiliate of South Carolina Public Radio's all-news network, airing a format of talk with some jazz and special musical programs on weekends.

History
This station signed on in 1981 and played classical music most of the time until 2005, when the decision was made to provide more NPR news programming to the Grand Strand.

References

External links

HMC-FM
NPR member stations